Oz and Hugh Raise the Bar is a BBC television programme in which wine personality and expert Oz Clarke and comedian and actor Hugh Dennis travel across Ireland and the United Kingdom in order to sample and discover the wide array of British and Irish Alcoholic beverages. In this series they collected different beverages from each location before selling them at a pub in Shustoke. Currently only one series has been made.

Background
Oz Clarke is an internationally known wine expert and writer who has worked in the wine industry since 1984. He has served as the wine correspondent for the Daily Telegraph and was previously featured on the BBC Two programme Food and Drink. Following the cancellation of Food and Drink, Clarke was paired with Top Gear presenter James May to produce a series of wine and drink related programs for the BBC. In the premise of those shows, Clarke was the beverage expert with James May serving as the "wingman" who was not as knowledgeable about the subject. In December 2009, Clarke was paired with comedian Hugh Dennis, a self-described "half a bottle drinker", to produce a similar odd couple dynamic in a one-off special entitled Oz and Hugh Drink to Christmas. Following the success of that one-off special a whole series was created.

Show premise
Oz Clarke and Hugh Dennis are on a mission to revive the good old British pub. Their plan: to scour the British Isles for the best independent drinks, soak up pub culture, and then open a pub of their own, packed full of drinks from England, Ireland, Scotland and Wales. But as they can't agree on what makes for the best of British and Irish booze, they're going to open two bars that will go head to head for one night only.

Episodes

References

External links
 

2011 British television series endings
2010 British television series debuts
BBC television documentaries
English-language television shows